Lithuania competed in the 2008 Summer Olympics, held in Beijing, People's Republic of China from August 8 to August 24, 2008.

Medalists

Athletics 

Men
Track & road events

Field events

Women
Track & road events

Field events

Combined events – Heptathlon

Badminton

Basketball

Men's tournament

Lithuania's men's basketball team qualified for the Olympics by placing third at Eurobasket 2007. Because the reigning world champions (and automatic qualifiers), Spain, were second at that tournament, Lithuania joined Russia to fill out Europe's two continental qualification spots. The Lithuanian team will seek to get past the semifinal round for the first time since beginning to compete separately—in the four tournaments since then, Lithuania has taken three bronze medals and a fourth-place finish.

Roster

Group play

Quarterfinals

Semifinals

Bronze medal game

Boxing

Lithuania qualified three boxers for the Olympic boxing tournament. Semiotas qualified at the 2007 World Championships. Kavaliauskas and Jakšto both earned spots at the second European tournament.

Canoeing

Sprint

Qualification Legend: QS = Qualify to semi-final; QF = Qualify directly to final

Cycling

Road

Track
Sprint

Pursuit

Omnium

Gymnastics

Artistic
Women

Judo

Modern pentathlon

Rowing

Men

Qualification Legend: FA=Final A (medal); FB=Final B (non-medal); FC=Final C (non-medal); FD=Final D (non-medal); FE=Final E (non-medal); FF=Final F (non-medal); SA/B=Semifinals A/B; SC/D=Semifinals C/D; SE/F=Semifinals E/F; QF=Quarterfinals; R=Repechage

Sailing

Women

M = Medal race; EL = Eliminated – did not advance into the medal race; CAN = Race cancelled;

Shooting

Women

Swimming 

Men

Women

Table tennis

Weightlifting

Wrestling

Men's Greco-Roman

 Mindaugas Mizgaitis originally finished third, but in November 2016, he was promoted to second place due to disqualification of Khasan Baroyev.

See also
 Lithuania at the 2008 Summer Paralympics

References

Nations at the 2008 Summer Olympics
2008
Summer Olympics